Global Balkans is an organizing network for activists working and researching in "solidarity" with Balkan social movements. Their aim is to "investigate, publicize and impact political, social and economic struggles" in the Balkan region. Its membership includes individuals of the various Balkan diasporas and those who sympathize or empathize with their cause. The network was founded by, amongst others, Andrej Grubačić.

References 

Diaspora organizations